Blind Owl can refer to:

Books
 The Blind Owl, famous Persian novel by Sadegh Hedayat 
 The Blind Owl (film) (French: La chouette aveugle), 1987 film of the novel by Sadegh Hedayat, directed by Raúl Ruiz.

Music
 Alan "Blind Owl" Wilson (1943–1970), American musician, leader, singer, and primary composer of the blues band Canned Heat
 The Blind Owl Band, American bluegrass-rock-country-folk band formed in 2011
 "Blind Owl", a song by Badfinger on the 1973 album Ass